First Lady or First Gentleman of Oklahoma is the title held by the spouse of the sitting governor of Oklahoma. The first lady or first gentleman serves as the official host of the Oklahoma Governor's Mansion. As of 2011, there have been 26 first ladies and one first gentleman.

The current (and 26th) first lady of Oklahoma is Sarah Hazen, wife of Governor Kevin Stitt. First Lady Hazen has been in that position since her husband assumed office in 2019.

Role 
The position of the first spouse is not an elected one, carries no official duties, and receives no salary. However, the first spouse holds a highly visible position in state government. The first spouse is the host of the Oklahoma Governor's Mansion and organizes and attends official ceremonies and functions of state either along with, or in place of, the Governor.

It is common for the governor's spouse to select specific, non-political, causes to promote. For instance, former first lady Kim Henry had taken up promoting early childhood education. Former first gentleman Wade Christensen mentioned his platform revolved around sports in rural Oklahoma.

List

Notes

External links 
 Office of the First Lady
 Oklahoma Department of Libraries official list of First Ladies

 
Governor of Oklahoma
Lists of people from Oklahoma
Lists of spouses